The Ocean Township School District is a community public school district that serves students in pre-kindergarten through sixth grade from Ocean Township, in  Ocean County, New Jersey, United States.

As of the 2018–19 school year, the district, comprising two schools, had an enrollment of 510 students and 53.6 classroom teachers (on an FTE basis), for a student–teacher ratio of 9.5:1.

The district is classified by the New Jersey Department of Education as being in District Factor Group "CD", the sixth-highest of eight groupings. District Factor Groups organize districts statewide to allow comparison by common socioeconomic characteristics of the local districts. From lowest socioeconomic status to highest, the categories are A, B, CD, DE, FG, GH, I and J.

For seventh through twelfth grades, public school students attend the schools  of the Southern Regional School District, which serves the five municipalities in the Long Beach Island Consolidated School District — Barnegat Light, Harvey Cedars, Long Beach Township, Ship Bottom and Surf City — along with students from Beach Haven and Stafford Township, together with the students from Ocean Township who attend as part of a sending/receiving relationship. Schools in the district (with 2018–19 enrollment data from the National Center for Education Statistics) are 
Southern Regional Middle School with 934 students in grades 7–8 and 
Southern Regional High School with 1,952 students in grades 9–12. Both schools are in the Manahawkin section of Stafford Township.

Schools
Schools in the district (with 2018–19 enrollment data from the National Center for Education Statistics) are:
Waretown Elementary School with an enrollment of 309 students in pre-K to 3rd grade
Ariane Phillips, Principal
Frederic A. Priff Elementary School with 198 students in grades 4 - 6
Sarah Reinhold, Principal

Administration
Core members of the district's administration are:
Dr. Christopher S. Lommerin, Superintendent
Steven Terhune, Business Administrator / Board Secretary

Board of education
The district's board of education, with nine members, sets policy and oversees the fiscal and educational operation of the district through its administration. As a Type II school district, the board's trustees are elected directly by voters to serve three-year terms of office on a staggered basis, with three seats up for election each year held (since 2012) as part of the November general election. The board appoints a superintendent to oversee the day-to-day operation of the district.

References

External links
Ocean Township School District

School Data for the Ocean Township School District, National Center for Education Statistics
Southern Regional School District

Ocean Township, Ocean County, New Jersey
New Jersey District Factor Group CD
School districts in Ocean County, New Jersey